Ferenc Szalay (born 30 March 1955) is a Hungarian politician, the mayor of Szolnok from 1998 to 2002 and since 2006. He was also a member of the National Assembly (MP) between 2002 and 2014.

Awards
 Mayor of the Year (2009)

References

1955 births
Living people
Hungarian men's basketball players
Fidesz politicians
Mayors of places in Hungary
Members of the National Assembly of Hungary (2002–2006)
Members of the National Assembly of Hungary (2006–2010)
Members of the National Assembly of Hungary (2010–2014)
People from Esztergom